Macau Asia Satellite Television (MASTV) is a television station located in Macau.  It is known for its critical news coverage.

History
The station was commenced and made its first broadcast on 1 June 2001.  In 2004 the station hired Taiwan trained journalists to enhance its news coverage and analysis.

Government raids

2006 raid
In March 2006 the police raided the Macau Peninsula office for illegal workers.  In that case, a suspected illegal worker was found, but the court found no evidence of illegal employment.

2009 raid
In February 2009 labour officers raided the satellite transmission station in Coloane.

2010 raid
At the end of the year in November 2009, one of the news show criticised the government for allowing an old hotel building to be redeveloped into a slot machine arcade.  In February 2010 eight journalists were summoned for questioning.

On 18 March 2010 seven labour officers and six police officers raided the station.  The government was searching for illegal workers from mainland China and raided the station.  According to an editor, Jackie Xie Qian, the raid took place at 6:30 pm right before the news broadcast.  The journalists were questioned.  He thought their critical coverage had offended the government and other powerful figures from the casino.  But the government said the raid has nothing to do with the coverage.  There were no illegal immigrants found.

Political columnists Anthony Wong dong said the raids targeted the station specifically.  No other station has been searched in the past 10 years.  The journalists from the station have reported many incidents of social injustice, including those related to labour issues.

References

External links
 Macau Asia Satellite Television Official site

Television networks in China
Mass media in Macau
Television in Macau
2001 establishments in Macau
Television channels and stations established in 2001